Boston Blackie's Chinese Venture is a 1949 mystery film directed by Seymour Friedman, starring Chester Morris. This was the last of Columbia's 14 Boston Blackie pictures (1941–49). Richard Lane, as long-suffering Inspector Farraday, was the only other character who appeared in all of the Boston Blackie films. George E. Stone, playing Blackie's sidekick The Runt, missed the first and the last films in the series due to illness. In Chinese Venture Stone was replaced by Sid Tomack as "Shorty."

Plot summary
Boston Blackie (Chester Morris) and his sidekick Shorty (Sid Tomack) are seen exiting a Chinese laundry where the proprietor is soon found murdered. The suspects include a bored tour guide, a B-girl in a tavern, the inhabitants of an old Chinatown tenement, and Blackie and Shorty themselves. Investigating the murder one jump ahead of the police, Blackie and Shorty uncover an illegal gambling ring.

Cast
 Chester Morris as Boston Blackie
 Maylia Fong as Mei Ling
 Richard Lane as Inspector William R. Farraday
 Sid Tomack as Shorty
 Frank Sully as Detective Sergeant Matthews
 Don McGuire as Les, the tour guide
 Joan Woodbury as Red, the bar girl
 Charles Arnt as Pop Gerard
 Luis Van Rooten as Bill Craddock (as Louis Van Rooten)
 Philip Ahn as Wong Chung Shee

References

External links 
 
 
 
 

1949 films
1949 mystery films
American black-and-white films
American sequel films
American mystery films
American detective films
Columbia Pictures films
Films directed by Seymour Friedman
Boston Blackie films
1940s English-language films
1940s American films